Route 222, also known as Salt Pond–Winterland Road, is a  north–south highway on the island of Newfoundland. It lies on the Burin Peninsula and connects the town of Winterland (at Route 210) with the Salt Pond portion of Burin (at Route 220). There no other major intersections or communities of any kind throughout its length.

Major intersections

References

222